The 1968–69 season was the 96th season of competitive football in Scotland and the 72nd season of Scottish league football.

Scottish League Division One

Champions: Celtic 
Relegated: Falkirk, Arbroath

Scottish League Division Two

Promoted: Motherwell, Ayr United

Cup honours

Individual honours

Other honours

National

County

 – aggregate over two legs – play off

Highland League

Scotland national team

Key:
(H) = Home match
(A) = Away match
WCQG7 = World Cup qualifying – Group 7
BHC = British Home Championship

Notes and references

External links
Scottish Football Historical Archive

 
Seasons in Scottish football